Dick Doherty was an Irish sportsperson.  He played hurling with his local club Mooncoin and with the Kilkenny senior inter-county team from 1906 until 1913.

Year of birth missing
Year of death missing
Mooncoin hurlers
Kilkenny inter-county hurlers
All-Ireland Senior Hurling Championship winners